Erik Rost (born May 30, 1985) is a Swedish ski-orienteering competitor, winner of the overall world cup, and junior world champion.

Ski orienteering
Rost won the overall World Cup in Ski Orienteering in 2007/2008.

He received three individual gold medals at the Junior World Ski Orienteering Championships in 2005.

Orienteering
He also was a member of Swedish junior team at Junior World Orienteering Championships 2005  and received a bronze medal in relay with John Fredriksson and Mikael Kristensson

References

External links
 
 

1985 births
Living people
Swedish orienteers
Male orienteers
Ski-orienteers
Foot orienteers
Junior World Orienteering Championships medalists